Pentecost Convention Centre (PCC) is located on 250 square acres of land at Gomoa Fetteh in the Central Region of Ghana. Inaugurated in May 2013 with ultra-modern buildings, it is designed to hold conventions for individuals and groups who wish to promote and share common interests. The centre offers sufficient auditoriums, conference centres, accommodation and a floor area to accommodate several thousand attendees. The venue is suitable for major camp meetings, church general meetings and trade exhibition. PCC has four auditoriums with 5,000, 3,000, 500 and 200 seating capacities respectively. It also contains 50 to 100 seating capacity conference rooms, range of executive, standard and economy accommodations and a 3000 seater restaurant.

Inauguration

The centre was inaugurated by President John Dramani Mahama during the 40th General Council Meeting of the church of Pentecost in May, 2013. The event under the theme "Worshipping in Spirit and in Truth" briefed the public on how the land was acquired for such a centre. The owners of the centre claim the Christian conference centre hosted both public and Christian activities with over five hundred thousand guests within its two years of operation.

The PCC since its inauguration has also become a place associated with famous Ghanaian political visits. President Nana Akuffo Addo paid visit when he was a candidate in January, 2016. He pledged that he would ensure that not a "single Ghanaian blood" will be shared for his electoral fortune. He delivered his first ever presidential address to a Christian gathering at the same place exactly one year later.

List of buildings
 Joseph Egyir-Paintsil Auditorium - 5000 seater auditorium
 Fred Diabene Walker Auditorium - 3000 seater auditorium
 J Cofie Quaye - 500 seater auditorium
 Samuel William Duffour Auditorium - 200 seater auditorium
 Executive conference room – 60 seater
 120 seater conference room
 100 seater conference room
 60 seater conference room
 Two 50 seater conference rooms
 Executive restaurant 
 Executive suite
 Standard suite
 Economy rooms
 Clinic
 Bank
 Spacious car park
 Serene ecosystem
 Kohinta Prayer Centre
 Pentecost Theological Seminary
 Security post manned by Ghana Police Service personnel

See also
 List of convention and exhibition centers

References

External links 

 pcc-global.org
 thecophq.org

 
Buildings and structures in Ghana
Event venues established in 2013
2013 establishments in Ghana